Ultranationalism or extreme nationalism is an extreme form of nationalism in which a country asserts or maintains detrimental hegemony, supremacy, or other forms of control over other nations (usually through violent coercion) to pursue its specific interests. Ultranationalist entities have been associated with the engagement of political violence even during peacetime. The belief system has also been cited as the inspiration behind acts of organized mass murder in the context of international conflict, e.g. the Cambodian genocide.

In ideological terms, scholars such as British political theorist Roger Griffin have found that ultranationalism arises from seeing modern nation-states as living organisms directly akin to physical people such that they can decay, grow, die, and additionally experience rebirth. Political campaigners have divided societies in stark mythological ways between those perceived as degenerately inferior and those perceived as a part of a great cultural destiny. Ultranationalism is an aspect of fascism, with historic governments such as the regimes of Nazi Germany, Francoist Spain and Fascist Italy building on ultranationalist foundations using specific plans of supposed widespread national renewal.

Background concepts and broader context

According to Janusz Bugajski, "in its most extreme or developed forms, ultra-nationalism resembles fascism, marked by a xenophobic disdain of other nations, support for authoritarian political arrangements verging on totalitarianism, and a mythical emphasis on the 'organic unity' between a charismatic leader, an organizationally amorphous movement-type party, and the nation".

British political theorist Roger Griffin has stated that ultranationalism is essentially founded on xenophobia in a way that finds supposed legitimacy "through deeply mythicized narratives of past cultural or political periods of historical greatness or of old scores to settle against alleged enemies". It can also draw on "vulgarized forms" of different aspects of the natural sciences such as anthropology and genetics, eugenics specifically playing a role, in order "to rationalize ideas of national superiority and destiny, of degeneracy and subhumanness" in Griffin's opinion. Ultranationalists view the modern nation-state as, according to Griffin, a living organism directly akin to a physical person such that it can decay, grow, die, and additionally experience rebirth. He has highlighted Nazi Germany as a regime which was founded on ultranationalism.

Historical movements and analysis

U.S. historian Walter Skya has written in Japan's Holy War: The Ideology of Radical Shinto Ultranationalism that ultranationalism in Japan drew upon traditional Shinto spiritual beliefs and militaristic attitudes regarding the nation's racial identity. By the early twentieth century, fanaticism arising from this combination of ethnic nationalism and religious nationalism caused opposition to democratic governance and support for Japanese territorial expansion. Skya particularly noted in his work the connection between ultranationalism and political violence by citing how, between 1921 and 1936, three serving and two former Prime Ministers of Japan were assassinated. The totalitarian Japanese government of the 1930s and 1940s relied not just on encouragement by the country's military but additionally enjoyed widespread popular support.

Historian Sambo Manara of Cambodia has found that the belief system sets forth a vision of supremacism in terms of international relations whereby hatred of foreigners to the point of extremism leads to policies of social separation and segregation. He has labeled the Cambodian genocide as a specific example of the ideology when applied in practice. "Obviously, it was ultranationalism, combined with the notion of class struggle in communism and a group of politicians, which lead to the establishment of Democratic Kampuchea, a ruthless regime which claimed approximately three million lives", he has remarked, with militant leaders finally deciding to "cut all diplomatic and economic ties with almost all countries" due to a "narrow-minded doctrine without taking into account all the losses they would face". In Manara's opinion, "this effectively destroyed the nation."

The absolute dictatorship of Romanian leader Nicolae Ceausescu has additionally been described as an example of communism taking an ultranationalist approach by Haaretz. The Israeli publication cited the antisemitism of the dictator in terms of actions such as his historical denialism about the Holocaust. Ceausescu additionally took efforts to purge those of Jewish background from political authority.

Haaretz has also labeled Hungarian Prime Minister Viktor Orban as an ultranationalist given that leader's views on autocratic rule and racial identity, particularly Orban's public condemnation of "race-mixing". He's also been called as such as by NPR, an American news agency, with the politician's inherent opposition to democratic liberalism as a concept being cited.

Israeli political journalist Gideon Levy wrote in late 2015 that the Israeli–Palestinian conflict has led to a decay in the civil society within Israel, with an ultranationalist movement that "bases its power on incitement to hatred" using "folkloric religion" gaining ground over decades such that:

Russian irredentism in which a militant imperial state is proposed that stretches across both Asia and Europe without regard for current international borders has been described as ultranationalism by the U.S. publication Los Angeles Times, with the aggressive actions of Russian President Vladimir Putin being credited as an evolution of political arguments by multiple figures from the past. Examples include Nikolai Berdyaev, Aleksandr Dugin (the author of 1997's The Foundations of Geopolitics: The Geopolitical Future of Russia), Lev Gumilyov, and Ivan Ilyin. The newspaper highlighted the justifications given in support of the 2022 Russian invasion of Ukraine, quoting Putin's declaration that he must militarily combat an "empire of lies" created by the U.S. to suffocate Russia.

The business-centered publication Bloomberg News stated in a 2021 story that the rise of ultranationalist viewpoints in China, particularly in terms of those who advocate for extremism on social media, presents a direct challenge to the current government of the nation, with General Secretary Xi Jinping facing opposition in his attempts to set forth climate change related economic reforms about greenhouse gases. Chinese political activists have asserted, according to the publication, a conspiracy theory that said reforms represent some kind of capitulation to foreign interests at the expense of China's citizens. Enviromentalist policies have come into being in a complex fashion inside China, facing complicated opinions among many.

Ultranationalist political parties

Currently represented in national legislatures 
The following political parties have been characterised as ultranationalist.

: Pauline Hanson's One Nation
: Freedom Party of Austria
: Vlaams Belang
: Revival
: Homeland Movement
: ELAM
: Freedom and Direct Democracy
: Danish People's Party
: Conservative People's Party of Estonia
: National Rally
: Finns Party
: Alternative for Germany
: Greek Solution
: Our Homeland Movement
: Religious Zionist Party
: Brothers of Italy
: Liberal Democratic Party (faction)
: National Movement
: Alliance for the Union of Romanians
: Liberal Democratic Party of Russia, Rodina
: Serbian Party Oathkeepers
: Economic Freedom Fighters
: People's Party Our Slovakia
: Vox
: Sweden Democrats
: Swiss People's Party
: Nationalist Movement Party, Great Union Party
: Svoboda

Represented parties with former ultranationalist tendencies or factions 
The following political parties historically had ultranationalist tendencies or factions.

 : Serb Democratic Party
 : Croatian Democratic Union
 : Jobbik
 : Golkar
 : VMRO-DPMNE
 : Dveri, Serbian Renewal Movement

Formerly represented in national legislatures 
: Attack, VMRO, National Front for the Salvation of Bulgaria
 : Communist Party of Kampuchea
 : Croatian Party of Rights, Croatian Pure Party of Rights
 : Golden Dawn
: Shiv Sena
 : Kach
: Imperial Rule Assistance Association
 : Union Solidarity and Development Party
 : Kilusang Bagong Lipunan
 : Serbian Radical Party, Party of Serbian Unity
 : Slovak National Party
 : National Party
: National Youth
 : FET y de las JONS
: Right Sector

Ultranationalist political organizations 
: Pancasila Youth
: Army Comrades Association
: Nippon Kaigi, Zaitokukai
: Perkasa
: Nationalist Front of Mexico, National Synarchist Union
: Patriotic Association of Myanmar
: Russian Imperial Movement, Wagner Group
: Bodu Bala Sena, Sinhala Ravaya
: Grey Wolves
: Azov Regiment
: English Defence League, Siol nan Gaidheal

See also

Far-right politics
Far-left politics
Nationalist terrorism
Palingenesis / Palingenetic ultranationalism
Rashism
Totalitarianism
Uyoku dantai

References

Fascism
Far-right politics
Nationalism
Neo-fascism
Political extremism
Political science terminology
Sectarianism
Xenophobia